Leonardo Capezzi  (born 28 March 1995) is an Italian professional footballer who plays as a midfielder for  club Perugia.

Club career
Capezzi is a youth exponent from Fiorentina. He made his professional debut at 7 November 2013 in a Europa League game against Romanian side CS Pandurii Târgu Jiu. He replaced defender Facundo Roncaglia after 80 minutes and helped Fiorentina come back from 0–1 to a 2–1 away win. On 1 September 2014, he moved on loan to Varese. On 26 June 2015, he returned to Fiorentina.

On 18 August 2015, he moved on loan to Crotone with option to ransom and against ransom for Fiorentina. The following year Sampdoria bought him, but he rejoined Crotone on loan.

On 3 August 2018, Capezzi joined to Empoli on loan  until 30 June 2019.

On 2 September 2019, Capezzi joined Spanish side Albacete on loan with an option to buy. On 30 January 2020, Sampdoria terminated the loan to Albacete and sent him on loan to Salernitana.

On 29 September 2020, he joined Salernitana on permanent deal.

On 30 January 2023, Capezzi signed with Perugia until the end of the 2022–23 season, with an option to extend for two more years.

International career
Capezzi made his debut with the Italy U21 side on 2 June 2016, in a friendly match against France.

References

External links

1995 births
Living people
Association football midfielders
Italian footballers
Italy under-21 international footballers
Italy youth international footballers
Serie A players
Serie B players
Segunda División players
ACF Fiorentina players
S.S.D. Varese Calcio players
U.C. Sampdoria players
F.C. Crotone players
Empoli F.C. players
Albacete Balompié players
U.S. Salernitana 1919 players
A.C. Perugia Calcio players
Italian expatriate footballers
Italian expatriate sportspeople in Spain
Expatriate footballers in Spain